The Shadow Ministry of Luke Foley was the Labor opposition from December 2014 to November 2018, opposing the Baird and Berejiklian coalition governments in the Parliament of New South Wales. The shadow ministry comprised 'spokespeople' or 'shadow ministers' who aim to hold the government of the day to account.

Second arrangement (2016–2018)
The shadow ministry was made up of 22 members of the NSW Labor caucus. This arrangement commenced in March 2016.

First arrangement (2014–2016)
The shadow ministry was made up of 22 members of the NSW Labor caucus.

See also
2015 New South Wales state election

References

Foley